Hans W. Petersen (28 January 1897 – 27 April 1974) was a Danish film actor. He appeared in 40 films between 1921 and 1974. He was born and had died in Denmark.

Selected filmography 

 The White Geisha (1926)
 Skal vi vædde en million? (1932)
 Han, hun og Hamlet (1932)
 Ud i den kolde sne (1934)
 Helle for Helene (1959)
 Det skete på Møllegården (1960)
 Lykkens musikanter (1962)
 Miss April (1963)
 School for Suicide (1964)
 Don Olsen kommer til byen (1964)
 Hunger (1966)
 Amour (1970)
 Oh, to Be on the Bandwagon! (1972)

References

External links 
 

1897 births
1974 deaths
20th-century Danish male actors
Best Supporting Actor Bodil Award winners
Danish male film actors
Danish male silent film actors